Laura Ilene Benanti (née Vidnovic; born July 13, 1979)  is an American actress and singer. Over the course of her Broadway career, she has received five Tony Award nominations. She played Louise in the 2008 Broadway revival of Gypsy, winning the 2008 Tony Award for Best Featured Actress in a Musical. Benanti then appeared in the Broadway musical Women on the Verge of a Nervous Breakdown in 2010, winning the Drama Desk Award and Outer Critics Circle Award for Best Featured Actress in a Musical. She played Elsa Schräder in the 2013 NBC television production of The Sound of Music Live! and, in 2015, began playing twin sisters Alura and Astra in the TV series Supergirl. Benanti appeared as Edie Randall in the TBS comedy The Detour from 2017 until the show's cancellation in 2019. Since 2016, she has had a recurring role as First Lady Melania Trump on The Late Show with Stephen Colbert.

Early life
Benanti was born in New York City to Linda Wonneberger, a vocal coach and former actress, and Martin Vidnovic, a Broadway actor and singer. She is of Serbian, German, and Irish heritage. Her parents divorced when she was young. She soon moved to Kinnelon, New Jersey, with her mother and stepfather Salvatore Benanti, a psychotherapist, whose name she took and whom she refers to as her father.

Benanti remembers being "very serious" and "a bit of an ugly duckling" as a child; she was intensely interested in musical theatre, saying she "came out of the womb as a 40-year-old". She was particularly interested in the music of Stephen Sondheim at an early age and distanced herself from other children. In 2008, Benanti told The New York Times that she drew on this loneliness in her portrayal of the neglected Louise in Gypsy. Though her parents refused to let Laura audition for professional theatre, Laura appeared in several high school and community productions, including Evita (as Perón's mistress), Follies (as Young Heidi), and Into the Woods (as Cinderella). At 16, Benanti played the title role in her high school production of Hello, Dolly! and won a Paper Mill Playhouse Rising Star Award for Outstanding Actress in a high school production. She graduated from Kinnelon High School in 1997.

Career

Theatre
In 1998, Paper Mill's then-artistic director Robert Johanson recommended Benanti for the role of Liesl in a Broadway revival of The Sound of Music. She auditioned for the show's producers and was considered too mature-looking to play Liesl, but, after several call-backs, was signed at the age of 18 to play one of the nuns and to understudy Rebecca Luker as Maria. Benanti played the role for two weeks while Luker was on vacation, and, at 19, took over the role when Luker left the production. Michael Buckley of Playbill later wrote that Benanti "was an absolutely wonderful Maria ... As do others, I believe that had she opened in the show, Benanti would have been an overnight sensation." When she was cast in The Sound of Music, Benanti had attended New York University for two weeks; the dean recommended she go on leave to take the job.

In 1999, Benanti appeared in the Broadway revue Swing!, for which she received a Tony nomination for Best Performance by a Featured Actress in a Musical. In 2000, she co-starred with Donna Murphy in the critically acclaimed New York City Center Encores! concert production of the Leonard Bernstein-Betty Comden-Adolph Green musical Wonderful Town.

In 2002, Benanti played Cinderella (a role she had played as a teenager) in the Broadway revival of Into the Woods and received both a Tony nomination for Best Performance by a Featured Actress in a Musical and a Drama Desk nomination for Outstanding Featured Actress in a Musical. During a mid-performance pratfall in Into the Woods, Benanti fractured her neck, herniating two discs directly onto her spinal cord and cutting off spinal fluid, a condition that sometimes leads to paralysis.

The injury was misdiagnosed, and Into the Woods producers asked Benanti not to mention her injury; when she began missing performances due to neck problems, rumors spread that Benanti was behaving unprofessionally, something that she called "really hurtful". She said, "I had a serious injury and there was absolutely no way I could have done the show. I tried to. I tried to go back and do it but I physically couldn't." Benanti was eventually replaced in the show by Erin Dilly. Eight months after her initial injury, Benanti was rediagnosed and received surgery that could have damaged her voice but was successful, though as of 2005 she still experienced neck pain and myelopathy.

Three weeks after undergoing spinal surgery, Benanti started previews in March 2003 for the Broadway revival of Nine, in which she played Claudia, a movie star who inspires Guido, a director played by Antonio Banderas. She left the show in September 2003. Benanti appeared in the World AIDS Day concerts of Pippin, Children of Eden, and The Secret Garden. From April to December 2006, she played Julia Sullivan in the Broadway musical The Wedding Singer.

In July 2007, Benanti played in a three-week limited run of the musical Gypsy in the Encores! staged concert production at the New York City Center as Louise, alongside Patti LuPone as Rose and Boyd Gaines as Herbie. In March 2008, the production transferred to Broadway, where it ran until January 2009 and received widespread critical acclaim. Benanti's performance as Louise was praised, with The New York Timess Ben Brantley declaring it "the performance of her career". She won several awards, including a Tony Award for Best Featured Actress in a Musical, a Drama Desk Award for Outstanding Featured Actress in a Musical, and an Outer Critics Circle Award for Outstanding Featured Actress in a Musical.

Benanti appeared in The Public Theater's world-premiere production of Christopher Durang's play Why Torture Is Wrong, And the People Who Love Them from April 6 to 26, 2009. She next appeared in the Lincoln Center Theater's production of Sarah Ruhl's In the Next Room (or The Vibrator Play) beginning previews on October 22, 2009, and opening on November 19, 2009, at the Lyceum Theatre.

Benanti appeared in the new musical Women on the Verge of a Nervous Breakdown on Broadway from October 8, 2010, until January 2, 2011. She received a Tony nomination and won the Drama Desk and Outer Critics Circle Awards for Best Featured Actress in a Musical for her performance. In June 2013, Benanti performed as the soprano soloist in the San Francisco premiere of Andrew Lippa's oratorio, I Am Harvey Milk. She played Goddess in The Public Theater's musical adaptation of The Tempest, which was presented at the Delacorte Theatre from September 6 through 8, 2013.

From April 2 through 6, 2014, Benanti starred as Rosabella in the New York City Center Encores! staged concert production of Frank Loesser's The Most Happy Fella alongside Shuler Hensley, Cheyenne Jackson, Jay Armstrong Johnson, and Heidi Blickenstaff.

On February 16, 2015, Benanti played Lucille Frank in the Manhattan Concert Productions presentation of Parade at Avery Fisher Hall, alongside Jeremy Jordan as Leo Frank. She appeared in New York Spring Spectacular at Radio City Music Hall from March 12 through May 7, 2015.

Benanti starred in the lead role of Amalia Balash in the 2016 Roundabout Theatre Company Broadway revival of She Loves Me opposite Zachary Levi. The production began previews at Studio 54 on February 19, 2016, and opened on March 17 for a limited engagement through July 10. She received a nomination for Tony Award for Best Actress in a Musical for this role.

In 2017, Benanti once again appeared on Broadway in Steve Martin's Meteor Shower, along with Keegan-Michael Key as Gerald, Amy Schumer as Corky, and Jeremy Shamos as Norm. The play premiered on Broadway on November 1, 2017, in previews, officially on November 29, 2017, at the Booth Theatre. The play closed on January 21, 2018.

Benanti replaced Lauren Ambrose as Eliza Doolittle in the Broadway Lincoln Center Theater revival of My Fair Lady, beginning October 23, 2018, for a limited run through February 17, 2019, except for Tuesday nights with Kerstin Anderson in the role. Benanti extended her appearance in the musical to July 7, 2019.

Television and film
In addition to stage roles, Benanti was a regular on the short-lived FX sitcom Starved (2005), which received mixed reviews, but Benanti described it as "a good experience. I got a lot of camera experience, which was something I just hadn't had." In 2006, she appeared in two films: Take the Lead, in which she reunited with her Nine co-star Antonio Banderas, and Falling for Grace as Princess Alexandra.

In 2008, Benanti had a recurring role on the ABC television series Eli Stone. She appeared in the pilot for the TV show as well.

In 2011, she was cast in the NBC series The Playboy Club, which was canceled after three episodes. Benanti played the wife of Dr. Atticus Sherman on Episode 11 of Season Two of The Big C, entitled "Fight Or Flight".

In 2011 and 2012, Benanti had a recurring role on Law & Order: Special Victims Unit as Detective Nick Amaro's wife. Benanti played the role of Lauren Bennett, a leader of a support group, on the NBC series, Go On. Go On was canceled in May 2013 after one season.

She had a recurring role on the USA series Royal Pains. On October 17, 2013, Benanti appeared in an episode of Elementary on CBS. She also appeared in Nurse Jackie and The Good Wife.

On December 5, 2013, Benanti played Elsa Schräder in the NBC production of The Sound of Music Live!

In 2014, she was cast as country singer Sadie Stone in the ABC musical drama series Nashville for its third season, recording and performing several songs during her arc.

In 2015, she joined the cast of Supergirl, where she has a recurring role as Alura In-Ze, Zor-El's wife and mother of Kara and Alura's twin sister General Astra, who wants to take over Earth as its new ruler and destroy her niece Kara. In July 2017, it was announced that Benanti would not return to the series for its third season due to her work schedule and that Erica Durance would assume the role of Alura. Benanti guest-starred as Edie, a United States Postal Service inspector, in the second season of The Detour and was later promoted to a series regular for season three.

On July 19, 2016, Benanti first impersonated Melania Trump on The Late Show with Stephen Colbert during the run-up to that year's U.S. presidential election, a role she reprised in subsequent appearances on that show.

In 2019, she joined the cast of Younger, playing the role of businesswoman and author Quinn Tyler.

In 2021, Benanti played the role of Francine in the film Here Today, co-written and directed by Billy Crystal, starring Crystal and Tiffany Haddish.

Recordings
Benanti can be heard on the original cast albums of each of her Broadway roles, as well as compilation albums of Stephen Schwartz and Maury Yeston. She participated in a studio cast recording of Rodgers and Hammerstein's Allegro, which was released by Sony Classics in February 2009. She also appears as a guest artist on the Gay Men's Chorus of Washington, D.C.'s live album, You've Got to Be Carefully Taught: The Songs of Hammerstein & Sondheim, taken from a 2002 performance at the Kennedy Center.

A songwriter and guitarist, Benanti has written songs privately since at least the early 2000s; in 2005, she said that she was working on a folk-rock solo CD, though "Musical theatre is my first love[...]I want to take my music and orchestrate it in a kind of old fashioned style, and take some standards and 'popularize' them—do a true crossover. I'm working on it."

In Constant Search of the Right Kind of Attention, a live recording of Benanti's concert engagement at 54 Below, was released by Broadway Records in September 2013.

Benanti released her self-titled first solo album in 2020.

Solo recordings
In Constant Search of the Right Kind of Attention: Live at 54 Below (2013)
I Like Musicals – Single (2016)
Laura Benanti (2020)

Broadway recordings
The Sound of Music (1998 Broadway Revival Cast Recording)
Swing! (1998 Original Broadway Cast Recording)
Into the Woods (2002 Broadway Revival Cast Recording)
Nine (2003 Broadway Revival Cast Recording)
The Wedding Singer (2006 Original Broadway Cast Recording)
Gypsy (2008 Broadway Revival Cast Recording)
Women on the Verge of a Nervous Breakdown (2011 Original Broadway Cast Recording)
She Loves Me (2016 Revival Cast Recording)
Songs From My Fair Lady (2019 Revival EP Recording)

Studio and concert recordings
The Stephen Schwartz Album – 1999 Studio Recording
The Maury Yeston Songbook – 2003 Studio Recording
NEO (New, Emerging... Outstanding!) – 2003 Concert Recording
You've Got To Be Carefully Taught: The Songs of Sondheim & Hammerstein – 2003 Gay Men's Chorus Of Washington D.C. Recording
Hair – 2004 Concert Recording
Wall to Wall Stephen Sondheim – 2006 Concert Recording
Allegro – 2008 Studio Recording
A Little Princess – 2010 Studio Recording
Songs from Amberland: Edie's Reckoning – 2022 Single Recording

Soundtracks
The Sound of Music Live: Music from the NBC Television Event – 2013 Soundtrack
The Music of Nashville: Season 3, Volume 1 — 2014 Soundtrack (contributed 3 tracks: "Can't Help My Heart" with Will Chase, "Sad Song" and "Novocaine" with Jonathan Jackson)
The Music of Nashville: Season 3, Volume 2 – 2015 Soundtrack (contributed 1 track: "Gasoline and Matches" with Connie Britton)

Personal life
Benanti met Chris Barron, lead singer of the Spin Doctors, in the early 2000s. They married on July 25, 2005, but by the end of that year were in the process of a divorce, which was finalized in 2006.

At the 2005 World AIDS Day "dream cast" concert of The Secret Garden, she met actor Steven Pasquale. They married in September 2007 and mutually filed for divorce in July 2013.

On June 12, 2015, she became engaged to Patrick Brown. They married on November 15, 2015. In 2017, they had a daughter. In 2022, a second daughter was born via surrogate.

Discography

Theatre

Filmography

Film

Television

Awards and nominations

References

External links
 
 
 

Living people
Actresses from New Jersey
Actresses from New York City
American film actresses
American women country singers
American musical theatre actresses
American sopranos
American stage actresses
American television actresses
American voice actresses
Drama Desk Award winners
People from Kinnelon, New Jersey
Tony Award winners
21st-century American actresses
20th-century American actresses
American people of Serbian descent
American people of Irish descent
American people of German descent
Country musicians from New York (state)
Country musicians from New Jersey
1979 births